= Chandukhedi =

- village
- Location within Madhya Pradesh Location within India
- Coordinates: 23.1562981°N 75.6848074°E
- Country: India
- State: Madhya Pradesh
- District: Bhopal
- Tehsil: Huzur
- Elevation: 503 m (1,650 ft)

Population (2011)
  - Total: 1,415
- Time zone: UTC+5:30 (IST)
- ISO 3166 code: MP-IN
- 2011 census code: 482352

Chandukhedi is a village in the Bhopal district of Madhya Pradesh, India. It is located in the Huzur tehsil and the Phanda block.

== Demographics ==
According to the 2011 census of India, Chandukhedi has 241 households. The effective literacy rate (i.e. the literacy rate of population excluding children aged 6 and below) is 68.54%.

Demographics (2011 Census)
	Total	Male	Female
Population	1415	880	535
Children aged below 6 years	188	102	86
Scheduled caste	117	59	58
Scheduled tribe	0	0	0
Literates	841	654	187
Workers (all)	738	606	132
Main workers (total)	615	566	49
Main workers: Cultivators	195	176	19
Main workers: Agricultural labourers	105	82	23
Main workers: Household industry workers	1	0	1
Main workers: Other	314	308	6
Marginal workers (total)	123	40	83
Marginal workers: Cultivators	79	28	51
Marginal workers: Agricultural labourers	38	8	30
Marginal workers: Household industry workers	1	0	1
Marginal workers: Others	5	4	1
Non-workers	677	274	403
